Mitochondrial import inner membrane translocase subunit TIM14 is an enzyme that in humans is encoded by the DNAJC19 gene on chromosome 3. TIM14 belongs to the DnaJ family, which has been involved in Hsp40/Hsp70 chaperone systems. As a mitochondrial chaperone, TIM14 functions as part of the TIM23 complex import motor to facilitate the import of nuclear-encoded proteins into the mitochondria. TIM14 also complexes with prohibitin complexes to regulate mitochondrial morphogenesis, and has been implicated in dilated cardiomyopathy with ataxia.

Structure 
The DNAJC19 gene is located on the q arm of chromosome 3 at position 26.33 and it spans 6,065 base pairs. The DNAJC19 gene produces a 6.29 kDa protein composed of 59 amino acids. The protein encoded by the DNAJC19 gene possesses an unusual structure compared to the rest of the DNAJ protein family. Notably, the DNAJ domain of TIM14 is located at the C-terminal rather than the N-terminal, and the transmembrane domain confers membrane-bound localization for TIM14 while other DNAJ proteins are cytosolic. TIM14 orthologs in other species, such as the yeast Tim14 and Mdj2p proteins, confirm localization to the mitochondrial inner membrane.

Function 

TIM14 is required for the ATP-dependent import of mitochondrial pre-proteins into the mitochondrial matrix. The J-domain of TIM14 stimulates mtHsp70 ATPase activity to power this transport.

Additionally, TIM14 helps regulate mitochondrial morphology by complexing with prohibitins to perform disphosphoglycerolipid cardiolipin (CL) remodeling. CL is a key phospholipid in mitochondrial membranes that modulates the fusion and fission of mitochondrial membranes, as well as mitophagy and apoptosis.

Clinical significance 

Defects in DNAJC19 have been observed primarily in cases of dilated cardiomyopathy with ataxia (DCMA), though it has also been associated with growth failure, microcytic anemia, and male genital anomalies. DNAJC19 was first implicated in DCMA in a study on the consanguineous Hutterite population, which has since been confirmed in other European populations. In the clinic, DNAJC19 mutations can be detected by screening for elevated levels of 3-methylglutaconic acid, mitochondrial distress, dilated cardiomyopathy, prolongation of the QT interval in the electrocardiogram, and cerebellar ataxia.

Interactions 

TIM14 interacts with:
 TIMM44,
 mtHsp70,
 TIMM16/PAM16, and
 PHB2.

References

Further reading 

 
 
 
 
 
 

Heat shock proteins